The Shinawatra family is a wealthy and powerful Thai Chinese family. Here is a list of prominent family members:

Seng Sae Khu, Hakka Chinese immigrant to Thailand who made a fortune through various businesses; following the 1938 Thaification, his son changed his surname to Shinawatra and the rest of the family followed suit
Chaiyasit Shinawatra (born 1945), former commander-in-chief of the Royal Thai Army and Thaksin's cousin
Somchai Wongsawat (born 1947), former Thai Prime Minister and Thaksin's brother-in-law
Thaksin Shinawatra (born 1949), former telecommunications billionaire, former Thai Prime Minister, and Seng Sae Khu's great-grandson
Yingluck Shinawatra (born 1967), former Thai Prime Minister and Thaksin's sister.
Potjaman Shinawatra (born 1956), Thaksin's former wife
Yaowaret Shinawatra, member of a subcommittee of the Education Council of Thailand, Mother of the Year 2012, and Thaksin's sister 
Panthongtae Shinawatra (born 1979), businessman and Thaksin's son
Chayika Wongnapachant (1979), assistant to Yingluck Shinawatra and Yaowaret Shinawatra's daughter (thus Thaksin and Yingluck's niece)

See also 
 Shinawatra University, private university in Thailand initiated by Thaksin Shinawatra

 
Thai Chinese families